Jessica Ho (born December 17, 1988), better known by her stage name Jessi, is an American rapper, singer, and entertainer based in South Korea. She was born in New York, raised in New Jersey, and moved to South Korea at the age of 15.

Jessi originally debuted in South Korea in 2005 and temporarily was part of the hip hop group Uptown in 2006. After a brief hiatus, she returned to music as part of the hip-hop trio Lucky J and as a soloist under YMC Entertainment until the group's disbandment in 2016. Following the end of her contract with YMC, she later moved to Psy's record label P Nation in 2019 as the first artist signed under the label, where she continued her solo career until her departure from the label in 2022. Several of her solo and collaborative singles have been commercially successful, with five Top 10 entries in the Gaon Digital Chart, including her highest-charting solo single "Nunu Nana" and the chart-topping single "Don't Touch Me" as part of the Refund Sisters.

Jessi is a prominent presence in Korean variety programs. She achieved mainstream popularity as part of the first season of Mnet hip hop competition show Unpretty Rapstar, where she placed second. She also served as a judge in competition shows High School Rapper and Cap-teen, as well as a host in her own YouTube talk show with SBS, Jessi's Showterview. She is also notable for her regular appearances in programs with comedian Yoo Jae-suk, such as guest appearances in Running Man and Hangout with Yoo, as well as being a series regular in Sixth Sense.

Career

2005–2014: Early career and Lucky J
Jessi made her debut with single album Get Up in 2005. In 2006 the hip hop group Uptown featured her in their album Testimony, replacing their original vocalist Yoon Mi-rae. Jessi's second single album, entitled "The Rebirth", was released in January 2009. After the release, she took a break from music, and left Korea to return to America.

In 2014, after a 5-year hiatus, Jessi returned as a member of hip-hop trio Lucky J with rapper J'Kyun and vocalist J-Yo. Lucky J debuted with the digital single "Can You Hear Me" under YMC Entertainment in July of that year.

2015–2018: Television roles and Un2verse

From January to March 2015, Jessi was part of the first season of Unpretty Rapstar, a spin-off of the program Show Me The Money. Unpretty Rapstar is a female rapper survival program, where contestants compete for the chance to be featured on tracks in a compilation album. Jessi was chosen as the second-place winner of the show by audience vote. After her appearance on Unpretty Rapstar, Jessi was featured in JYP's single "Who's Your Mama?" and its music video, which were both released in April 2015. The track topped all nine major music charts in Korea as soon as it was released. She released her first ever solo rap single, "Ssenunni", on September 15. On October 16, 2015, Jessi performed in the United States for the first time at the Belasco Theater in Los Angeles with hip-hop duo Mighty Mouth.

In 2016, Jessi was cast in Sister's Slam Dunk. In 2017, Jessi released another rap single, "Gucci" from her first mini-album, entitled Un2verse, both of which released on July 13. On July 6, 2018, she released a single titled "Down".

2019–present: P Nation and Nuna 

Jessi's contract with YMC Entertainment ended in October 2018, and in January 2019, she signed a contract with Psy's record label P Nation. Her first single under the label, "Who Dat B," was released on September 23, 2019. "Who Dat B" peaked at number eight on the World Digital Songs Sales chart and 68 on the Billboard Korea K-Pop Hot 100. She released another rap single, "Drip" featuring Jay Park, on November 2. The collaboration reached number 16 on the World Songs chart.

On June 4, 2020, Jessi premiered her new variety show, Jessi's Showterview, on SBS's Mobidic YouTube channel.

The singer released her second extended play, Nuna, on July 30. The single "Nunu Nana" was released in conjunction with the EP. "Nunu Nana" peaked at number two on the Gaon Digital Chart, becoming her first top-ten single as a solo artist and her highest-charting solo single. On August 14, the music video for "Numb" was released.

Jessi joined the cast of MBC reality-variety show Hangout with Yoo in August 2020 as a member of four-member supergroup Refund Sisters (환불 원정대). The group consists of Jessi along with Korean singers Lee Hyo-ri, Uhm Jung-hwa, and Hwasa; they made their debut on October 10, releasing their debut single, "Don't Touch Me." "Don't Touch Me" peaked atop the Gaon Digital Chart for two consecutive weeks.

She also became part of the main cast of tvN variety show Sixth Sense, which reunited her with Yoo Jae-suk and premiered in September 2020. She returned for the series' second season, which began airing in June 2021.

On March 17, 2021, Jessi released a new digital single titled "What Type of X" (어떤X). On October 12, Jessi released the single "Cold Blooded," which was served as a collaborative track with the Mnet dance crew competition show Street Woman Fighter; the dance crews were tasked to choreograph for the song, with YGX winning the segment. Jessi and fellow singer Sunmi featured in an official remix for Ed Sheeran's song "Shivers," which was released on November 24.

On April 1, 2022, the agency announced that Jessi would make a comeback with the digital single "Zoom" on April 13. The song peaked at number twelve at the Gaon Digital Chart. The song became a viral hit on video platform TikTok. Psy's ninth studio album, released April 29, 2022, features Jessi on the track 'Ganji'.

On June 10, 2022, it was confirmed that Jessi's contract with P Nation would expire in June 2022, and at the time she was  discussing a potential contract extension. On July 6, 2022, P Nation announced that Jessi left the company after three years with the label.

Personal life
Jessi attended Korea Kent Foreign School along with Girls' Generation members Tiffany Young and Jessica Jung. Jessi successfully passed an S.M. Entertainment audition, the same company her two classmates were under. However, she chose not to become part of the label, as she believed its approach to music did not match her style. Before Jessi went on temporary hiatus from the music industry, she struggled to become accustomed to Korean culture. She did not find immediate success after her debut, and was sometimes forced to sleep in saunas when she did not have enough money for a place to stay.

In 2013, during her break from the music industry, a controversy about Jessi's involvement in an alleged assault surfaced. The professed victim soon dropped the charges against the singer, and the investigation was closed.

Discography

Extended plays

Single albums

Live albums

Singles

As a lead artist

As a featured artist

Collaborations

Soundtrack appearances

Other charted songs

Songwriting and composing credits
All song credits are adapted from Korea Music Copyright Association(KMCA) database, and Melon otherwise noted

Note: jessi credited as co-arranger for "Numb"

Filmography

Television show

Web show

Television series

Concerts
 Zoom in Manila (2022)

Awards and nominations

Notes

References

External links 

1988 births
Living people
Uptown (band) members
South Korean women rappers
South Korean women singers
South Korean hip hop singers
South Korean female idols
South Korean television personalities
American expatriates in South Korea
American women rappers
American dance musicians
Television personalities from New York City
American women television personalities
American musicians of Korean descent
American people of South Korean descent
Rappers from New York City
Unpretty Rapstar contestants
21st-century American singers
21st-century South Korean singers
21st-century American women singers
21st-century American rappers
People from Queens, New York
21st-century women rappers